Emma Millar (born 9 December 1991 in Paraparaumu) is a New Zealand professional squash player. As of February 2018, she was ranked number 116 in the world.

References

1991 births
Living people
New Zealand female squash players
People from Paraparaumu